Kokubo (written: ,  or ) is a Japanese surname. Notable people with the surname include:

 Christina Kokubo (1950–2007), American actress
, Japanese baseball player
, Japanese footballer
, Japanese snowboarder
 Leo Kokubo (born 2001), Japanese footballer
, Japanese baseball player

See also
 Kokubo Station, a railway station in Kōfu, Yamanashi Prefecture, Japan
 Shusei Kokubou (Static Defense), slogan of the Imperial Japanese Navy

Japanese-language surnames